Monica is a female given name with many variant forms, including Mónica (Italian, Spanish and Portuguese), Mônica (Brazilian Portuguese), Monique (French), Monika (German, Indian), Moonika (Estonia),  and Mónika (Hungarian).

History 
The etymology of Monica is unknown. Its earliest attestation known today is as the name of Saint Monica, mother of Saint Augustine. St. Monica was born in Numidia in North Africa, but was also a citizen of Carthage, hence the name may be of Punic or Berber origin. It has also been associated with the Greek word monos, meaning "alone". Though etymologically unrelated, "Monica" was also a name in Latin, deriving from the verb monere, meaning 'to advise.'

One of the early occurrences of the name in modern literature is the character Monica Thorne in the 1858 novel Doctor Thorne by Anthony Trollope.

Popularity 

In the United States, the name's popularity reached a peak in 1977, when it was the 39th most popular female name for new births. The popularity has gradually waned since then, being 76th most popular in 1990, and 363rd in 2010.

Name day 

In the European tradition of name day celebration, the date for the name Monica or Monika varies from country to country. In Hungary it is 4 May, as it is in Sweden. In Slovakia it is 7 May, and in the Czech Republic it is celebrated on 21 May. In Italy, Poland, Portugal and Spain it is celebrated on 27 August. In Latvia it is celebrated on 6 October and in Greece on 15 June.

Notable people
Monica Aksamit (born 1990), American fencer
Monica Aldama, American cheerleading coach
 Monica Ali (born 1967), British author
 Monica Arnold (born 1980), American singer, professionally known as "Monica"
 Monica Aspelund (born 1946), Finnish singer
 Monica Bandini (1964–2021), Italian road racing cyclist
 Monica Bellucci (born 1964), Italian actress
 Monica Beltran (born 1985), American soldier
 Monica Birwinyo (born 1990), Ugandan actress
 Monica Brant (born 1970), American fitness/figure competitor and model
 Mónica Carrillo (born 1976), Spanish journalist and novelist
 Monica Cole (1922–1994), English geographer 
 Mónica Astorga Cremona (born 1967), Argentine nun
 Mónica Cruz (born 1977), Spanish actress
 Monica Dickens (1915–1992), British author of books for adults and children
 Monica Edwards (1912–1998), British children's author
 Monica Evans (born 1940), British actress
 Mónica Falcioni (born 1968), Uruguayan long and triple jumper
 Mónica Feria Tinta (born 1966), British/Peruvian barrister, public international law specialist
 Monica Goodling (born 1973), former Director of Public Affairs for the U.S. Department of Justice
 Monica Hickmann Alves (born 1987), Brazilian footballer
 Monica De Gennaro (born 1987), Italian volleyball player
 Monica Horan (born 1963), American actress
 Monica of Hippo (322–387), Numidian saint, the mother of Saint Augustine
 Monica Iozzi (born 1981), Brazilian actress and reporter
 Monica Keena (born 1979), American actress
Mónica Kräuter (born 1967), Venezuelan chemist and professor
Monica Lewinsky (born 1973), American White House intern and scandal celebrity
 Monica Lierhaus (born 1970), German sports journalist and television host 
 Mónica López (politician), Argentine politician
 Monica Macovei, Romanian politician
 Mónica Martínez (born 1975), Spanish journalist, model and television presenter
 Mónica Montañés (born 1966), Venezuelan screenwriter and journalist.
Monica Murnan (born 1966), American politician
 Monica Naisen (died 1626), Japanese Roman Catholic martyr beatified in 1867
 Mónica Naranjo (born 1974), Spanish singer
 Monica von Neumann, American socialite
 Monica Niculescu (born 1987), Romanian tennis player
 Mónica Pont (born 1969), Spanish long-distance runner
 Monica Potter (born 1971), American actress
 Monica Raymund (born 1986), American actress
 Mónica Regonesi (born 1961), Chilean long-distance runner
 Monica Rial, American voice actress and ADR director
 Mônica Rodrigues (born 1967), Brazilian volleyball player
Monica Ruwanpathirana, Sri Lankan poet
Monica Simpson, American reproductive rights activist 
 Monica Seles (born 1973), American-Serbian tennis player
 Monica VanDieren, American mathematician
 Mónica Vergara (born 1983), Mexican footballer
 Monica Vitti (born 1931), Italian actress
 Monica Yunus (born 1979), Bangladeshi-Russian-American opera singer
 Monica Zetterlund (1937–2005), Swedish singer and actress

Fictional characters
 Monica Geller in the TV series Friends
 Monica Gallagher in the TV series Shameless (UK) and Shameless (US)
 Monica Madden in George Gissing's 1893 novel The Odd Women
 Monica Quartermaine in the TV series General Hospital
 Monica Rambeau in Marvel Comics
 Monica Reeves in the film Bad Hair Day
 Monica Vandham in Xenoblade Chronicles 3
 Monica in the film Baby Driver
 Monika in Doki Doki Literature Club
 Monica in the animated series Oggy and the Cockroaches
 Monica in Monica's Gang
 Monica, a crossing guard in The Angry Birds Movie
 Monica in the TV series Touched by an Angel

See also
 Monika (given name)
 Mona (name)
 Monica (disambiguation)

References 

Feminine given names
Romanian feminine given names
Italian feminine given names
Portuguese feminine given names

cs:Monika
eo:Moniko
hu:Mónika
nl:Monica
ja:モニカ
nn:Monika
pl:Monika
pt:Monica
ru:Моника
sk:Monika
sl:Monika
fi:Monika
sv:Monika